Kılavuz is a village in Bor district of Niğde Province, Turkey. The population of Kılavuz was 615 as of 2011.

References 

Villages in Bor District, Niğde